Barsana is a historical town and nagar panchayat in the Mathura district of the state of Uttar Pradesh, India. The town holds cultural and religious significance as it is the birthplace and home of the Hindu goddess Radha, the chief consort of Krishna. Barsana is situated in the Braj region. The main attraction of the town is the historical Radha Rani Temple which attracts huge number of devotees throughout the year.

Barsana is an integral part of the Krishna pilgrimage circuit which also includes Mathura, Vrindavan, Govardhan, Kurukshetra and Dwarka.

Demographics
 India census, Barsana had a population of 9215. Males constitute 53% of the population and females 47%. Barsana has an average literacy rate of 53%, lower than the national average of 59.5%; with 66% of the males and 34% of females literate. 19% of the population is under 6 years of age.

Significant places 
Barsana is one of the most important pilgrimage center, which enchants pilgrims and devotees with the performances based on the life events of Radha and her consort Krishna. The significant places include- 
 Radha Rani Temple, the main attraction of Barsana
 Bhanusarovar - Water pond dedicated to Vrishabhanu, father of goddess Radha
 Chaturbhuj (temples of Nimbarka Sampradaya) and Brajeshwar Mahadev (temple dedicated to Shiva)
 Ravari Kund, Pavari Kund, Tilak Kund, Mohini Kund, Lalita Kund and Dohani Kund
 There are also other temples dedicated to Vrishbhanu and Balarama
 Sankhari Khor 
 Rangeeli Mahal
 Kirti Mandir 
 Maan Mandir
 Shri Radha Kushal Bihari Temple 
 Daan Bihari Temple

Transportation

Road 
Barsana is well connected by roads. One has to follow state highways to get to this town/city.

140 km from New Delhi

130 km from Gurgaon

100 km from Agra

40 km from Mathura

08 km from Nandgaon

20 km from Goverdhan

Rail 

 BDB/Vrindavan is on the Mathura-Vrindavan MG link.
 VRBD/Vrindavan Road is on the Agra-Delhi chord.

Flight 
Nearest Airports are Agra Airport and New Delhi International Airport.

References 

Mathura district
Cities and towns in Mathura district
Tourist attractions in Mathura district
Hinduism
Tourism
Tourism by city
Locations in Hindu mythology
Radha Krishna temples
Krishna temples
Holy cities
Hindu holy cities
Hindu pilgrimages
Hindu pilgrimage sites
Hindu pilgrimage sites in India
Religious tourism
Religious tourism in India
Ancient Indian cities